Angele was a deme of ancient Attica, of the phyle of Pandionis, sending two, three, or four delegates to the Athenian Boule.  Its site is located near modern Angelisi.

References

Populated places in ancient Attica
Former populated places in Greece
Demoi